A badger is any of several species of short-legged, heavy-set carnivores in the weasel family.

Badger may also refer to:

Places

Australia
 Badger Island, Tasmania
 Little Badger Island, Tasmania

Canada
 Badger, Newfoundland and Labrador

United Kingdom
 Badger, Shropshire

United States
 Badger, Alaska
 Badger, California
 Badger Hill, California
 Badger, Iowa
 Badger, Minnesota
 Badger, South Dakota
 Badger, Washington
 Badger, Wisconsin
 Badger Valley, a valley in Wisconsin
 Badger's Island, Kittery, Maine
 Wisconsin, "The Badger State"
 Bucky Badger, mascot of the University of Wisconsin–Madison
 Wisconsin Badgers, the athletic teams of the University of Wisconsin–Madison

People
 Badger (person), an archaic English term for a dealer in food
 Badger (surname)
 Dorgon, a Manchu prince and Emperor of the Qing dynasty, whose name literally means "badger" in Manchu

Arts, entertainment, and media

Fictional characters

 Badger (comics) (The Badger), a comic book character and series created in 1982
 Badger (Firefly), a minor character from the American TV show Firefly
 Badger (Monarch of the Glen), a character from UK TV series Monarch of the Glen
 Badger, a character in the children's book The Wind in the Willows by Kenneth Grahame
 Badger, a character in the children's novel The Animals of Farthing Wood by Colin Dann
 Badger, a character in the English children's television programme Bodger and Badger
 Badger (Breaking Bad), a character in the television show Breaking Bad
 Bill Badger, the main character of a series of books by Denys Watkins-Pitchford including Bill Badger and the Pirates
 Lt. Cdr. Robert Badger (The Artful Bodger), a character in several John Winton naval novels
 Badger Beadon, a character from Why Didn't They Ask Evans? by Agatha Christie
 Badger Lords, of whom there are several in the Redwall series by Brian Jacques
 Badger Myer, the younger brother in the film Better Off Dead

Music
 Badger (band), an early 1970s rock band featuring Tony Kaye, ex-Yes
 Badger, an album by The Figgs

Television
 Badger (TV series), a 1999 British series starring Jerome Flynn
 "The Badger", Season 2, Episode 9 of Ozark

Other arts, entertainment, and media
 Badgers (animation) or Badger Badger Badger, a short animation by Jonti Picking
 Badger Books, a British paperback imprint of the 1950s and '60s
 The Badger (newspaper), a newspaper published by the University of Sussex

Transport
 Badger (automobile company), a car company in Wisconsin from 1910 to 1911
 Badger, an Amtrak train on the Chicago-Milwaukee (U.S.) corridor now served by the Hiawatha Service
 Badger armoured engineering vehicle, a modified version of the Leopard 1 tank, used by the Canadian and German armies
 Nikola Badger, a cancelled proposed electric pickup truck
 Badger Bus, a service between Milwaukee and Madison, Wisconsin, U.S.
 Badgerline, a bus company in the southwest of England
 British Rail Class 89, nicknamed "The Badger", an electric locomotive developed by British Rail
 S.S. Badger, an auto/passenger ferry operating on Lake Michigan, U.S.
 Tupolev Tu-16, NATO codename Badger, a Soviet twin-engine jet bomber
 USS William Badger (1861), an American Civil War Union supply ship and ship's tender

Other uses
 Badger, to direct argumentative questions at a person
 Badger, the South African variant of the Finnish Patria AMV (Armored Modular Vehicle)
 Badger Ales, beers brewed by Hall & Woodhouse
 Badger Game, an extortion scheme
 Breezy Badger, a code name for version 5.10 of the Linux software Ubuntu
 Brock Badgers, athletics teams for Brock University, Canada
 St John Badger, a youth member (aged 5–10) of the St John Ambulance voluntary organisation
 Upshot-Knothole Badger, a 1953 nuclear test at the Nevada Test Site, U.S.

See also

 
 Bâdgir, an Iranian windcatcher